James Nabrit may refer to:

 James Nabrit Jr. (1900–1997), American civil rights attorney
 James Nabrit III (1932–2013), African American civil rights attorney